= Eumenides =

Eumenides may refer to:

- Erinyes, or Eumenides, Greek deities of vengeance
- The Eumenides, the third part of Aeschylus' Greek tragedy, the Oresteia
